Mawe or Mawé may refer to:

Mawé, Burkina Faso,a town
Mawé people, an indigenous people of Brazil
Mawé language, their language

People with the name 
 Leonard Mawe (1550s–1629), English bishop
 John Mawe (1764–1829), English mineralogist
 Sarah Mawe (1767–1846), English mineralogist